Kuhsar District is in Salmas County, West Azerbaijan province, Iran. At the 2006 National Census, its population was 30,452 in 5,324 households. The following census in 2011 counted 26,952 people in 5,407 households. At the latest census in 2016, the district had 27,916 inhabitants in 6,299 households.

References 

Salmas County

Districts of West Azerbaijan Province

Populated places in West Azerbaijan Province

Populated places in Salmas County